Abraham Watkins Venable (October 17, 1799 – February 24, 1876) was a 19th-century US politician and lawyer from North Carolina. He was a slaveholder. He was the nephew of congressman and senator Abraham Bedford Venable.

Biography
Born in Springfield, Virginia, he graduated from Hampden–Sydney College in 1816. He studied medicine for two years before turning to law. He later graduated from Princeton University in 1819 and was admitted to the bar in 1821.

He practiced law in Virginia in both Prince Edward and Mecklenburg counties until 1829 when he moved to North Carolina. He later got involved in politics and served as a presidential elector in the elections of 1832, 1836 and 1844 and was elected to the 30th Congress as a Democrat, serving from 1847 to 1853. He ran unsuccessfully for reelection in 1852.

Venable was a presidential elector in the 1860 presidential election on the Democratic ticket for John C. Breckinridge and Joseph Lane. He delivered a number of addresses to colleges, including at Princeton in 1851 and at Wake Forest in 1858.

When his state seceded from the Union, he went with it to the Confederacy and was elected to the Provisional Confederate Congress. He was later elected to the first Confederate congress, serving from 1862 to 1864. He died in Oxford, North Carolina in 1876 and was interred at Shiloh Presbyterian Churchyard in Granville County, North Carolina. Like many other members of the Venable, Watkins, and Daniel families (including Nathaniel Venable and Elizabeth Venable,) he was an ancestor of Isabelle Daniel Hall Fiske (Barbara Hall), the cartoonist, artist, and co-creator of Quarry Hill Creative Center in Vermont (founded 1946 and still extant).

References

External links

  Retrieved on 2009-03-21
 Abraham W. Venable at The Political Graveyard

1799 births
1876 deaths
1832 United States presidential electors
1836 United States presidential electors
1860 United States presidential electors
Members of the Confederate House of Representatives from North Carolina
Princeton University alumni
Virginia lawyers
North Carolina lawyers
Deputies and delegates to the Provisional Congress of the Confederate States
Democratic Party members of the United States House of Representatives from North Carolina
19th-century American politicians
19th-century American lawyers
Activists from North Carolina
People from Granville County, North Carolina